HMS Hythe was a  built for the Royal Navy during the Second World War.

Design and description
The Bangor class was designed as a small minesweeper that could be easily built in large numbers by civilian shipyards; as steam turbines were difficult to manufacture, the ships were designed to accept a wide variety of engines. The ship's complement consisted of 60 officers and ratings.

She was powered by two Parsons geared steam turbines, each driving one shaft, using steam provided by two Admiralty three-drum boilers.

The turbine-powered Bangors were armed with a 12-pounder  anti-aircraft gun and a single QF 2-pounder (4 cm) AA gun. In some ships the 2-pounder was replaced a single or twin 20 mm Oerlikon AA gun, while most ships were fitted with four additional single Oerlikon mounts over the course of the war. For escort work, her minesweeping gear could be exchanged for around 40 depth charges.

Construction and career
Hythe was built by Ailsa Shipbuilding Co. Ltd. in Troon, Scotland and commissioned in 1941. Her pennant number was J 194.  So far she has been the only ship of the Royal Navy to bear the name Hythe, after the town of Hythe in Kent, however, the SS Hythe, a cross-channel ferry of the South Eastern and Chatham Railway, built by Denny, Dumbarton, was requisitioned by the Royal Navy in 1914, converted to a minesweeper and became HMS Hythe; whilst in later use as a troop carrier she was run down by HMS Sarnia off Cape Helles in the Dardanelles on 28 October 1915 and sank with the loss of 155 lives.

Hythe saw service in the Mediterranean Sea during the Second World War, where she was based in Malta as part of the 14th/17th Minesweeper Flotilla. She was torpedoed and sunk by the  commanded by Waldemar Mehl on 11 October 1943 off Bougie, Algeria.

References

Bibliography

External links 
 
 http://www.wrecksite.eu/wreck.aspx?137093
 Minesweeping at Malta

 

Bangor-class minesweepers of the Royal Navy
Ships built on the River Clyde
1941 ships
World War II minesweepers of the United Kingdom
Ships sunk by German submarines in World War II
World War II shipwrecks in the Mediterranean Sea
Maritime incidents in October 1943